Gretna Margaret Weste  (5 September 1917 – 30 August 2006) was a leading scientist noted for her work in plant pathology and mycology, specifically with Phytophthora cinnamomi.

Biography
Gretna Margaret Weste (née Parkin) was born in Dumfriesshire, Scotland in 1917 to Australian parents, Grace and Arthur Parkin. Her father was a volunteer chemist in the local munitions factory, H.M. Factory Gretna,which produced Cordite RDB, colloquially known as the "Devil's Porridge". The family lived at 24 the Ridge, Eastriggs during World War One and a brother Tom was also born during this time.

The family returned to Australia when Gretna was two years old, and she grew up in Surrey Hills, an outer-suburb of Melbourne.

Her schooling was completed through scholarships, first at the Methodist Ladies' College, Melbourne where she gained final-year honors at the botany exhibition, and won a government scholarship to the University of Melbourne. At the University of Melbourne, she obtained a Bachelor of Science (BSc) in 1938 and Master of Science (MSc) in 1939 on wood anatomy. She was awarded a PhD in 1969 and a University of Melbourne Doctor of Science (DSc) in 1984 for her published papers. In 1989 she was awarded a Member in the Order of Australia (AM) for "service to science, particularly in the field of botany.

Research
Weste was noted for her many contributions to the fields of plant pathology and mycology. For her Masters of Science research, she studied wood anatomy—which proved useful in preserving the huge quantities of dead standing Mountain Ash timber which resulted as a consequence of the Black Friday bushfires of 1939. Her Doctor of Philosophy degree was in agricultural plant pathology, on the root-rotting pathogen of wheat Gaeumannomyces graminis. After this she turned her research attention to Phytophthora cinnamomi, a root pathogen of Australian indigenous plants.

Personal life 
Gretna Parkin married Geoffe Weste, a forester, in December 1941 and they had three children.

See also
 Backusella westeae – named in honour of Weste

References

External links

 

1917 births
2006 deaths
Australian biologists
Australian mycologists
Women mycologists
20th-century biologists
20th-century women scientists
University of Melbourne women
Members of the Order of Australia